KW automotive GmbH is a German company that primarily develops suspension systems for the automotive, motorcycle, and motorsport industries.

History 
The company was originally founded under the name KW Tuning in 1992 by Klaus Wohlfarth. The company originally sold and distributed car parts out of a 75 square meter retail building in Murrhardt.

In 1995, the first coilover suspension system by the company was introduced by Klaus and his brother Jürgen. This system was approved by the TÜV and was presented at the Essen Motor Show. The company shifted their focus fully to suspension, under the new name KW Coilover Suspensions in a new 150 square metre facility. The company relocated to a new 1,000 square meter facility in Fichtenberg and is renamed to KW automotive GmbH in 1998.

Company 
KW automotive employs approximately 1,202 employees worldwide with 13 locations. The company is headquartered in Fichtenberg, Germany, where the main R&D departments and production site are also located. KW also has branch offices and subsidiaries worldwide: BBS Automotive in Schiltach and Herbolzheim, KW Damping Technologies in Abadiño, Spain, KW automotive Schweiz in Rotkreuz, Switzerland, KW automotive UK in Kent, United Kingdom, Reiger Suspension in Molenenk, Netherlands, KW automotive NA in Clovis, California, BBS of America in Braselton, Georgia, KW suspensions China in Shanghai, China, KW automotive Taiwan in Taichung City, Taiwan, KW automotive Japan in Kyoto, Japan, and AL-KO Automotive Parts Manufacturing in Fenghua, China.

KW suspensions 
The company's flagship brand KW suspensions produces suspension for aftermarket, motorsport, and OEM applications. KW suspensions also produces other types of vehicle components, including steering dampers, chassis parts, and ride height control systems.

With over 26,000 individual applications in aftermarket suspension, KW suspensions has the largest aftermarket suspension portfolio in the industry.

Additionally, in original equipment applications, KW suspensions has developed numerous suspension systems for factory vehicles, such as the Mercedes SLK 55 AMG Black Series, CLK 63 AMG Black Series, SL 65 AMG Black Series, and G 500 4×4², as well as the Dodge Viper SRT-10 ACR-X and BMW M4 GTS.

KW suspensions has been influential in high-end suspension systems and components manufacture, with innovations including stainless steel construction, the first height adjustable rear-axle springs, hydraulic lift system (HLS), DDC plug-and-play systems for use with factory active suspension, and the utilization of an in-house advanced 7-post drive dynamics test stand, similar to those used in Formula One development, which is rare in the road car suspension industry.

Other brands 
KW automotive owns a large automotive group of brands covering industries such as wheels, suspension, chassis components, and sim racing, with prominent subsidiaries such as BBS Automotive, ST Suspensions, Reiger Suspension, Belltech, ap Sportfahrwerke, AL-KO, TrackTime, Ascher Racing, and RaceRoom.

Motorsport 

KW has a strong presence and great success in various forms of motorsport, especially in sports car racing. KW Competition suspensions are used in the FIA GT Championship, ADAC GT Masters, ADAC GT4 Germany, ADAC TCR Germany, Blancpain GT Series Endurance Cup, VLN Endurance Championship Nürburgring, Nürburgring 24 Hours, KW Bergcup, DMV Challenge, and Bathurst 12 Hour. KW suspensions is also a competition partner with BMW Motorsport, Manthey Racing, Falcon Motorsport, Teichmann Racing, Adrenaline Motorsports, Team 75 Bernhard, and Rowe Racing.

References

External links 
 

Auto parts suppliers of Germany
Shock absorber manufacturers
Wheel manufacturers
Automotive motorsports and performance companies
Companies based in Baden-Württemberg
German brands